Club Deportivo Roldán is a Spanish football club based in Roldán, Torre-Pacheco, in the Region of Murcia. Founded in 1969, the club was dissolved in 1996.

History
Founded in 1969, Roldán played in the regional leagues until 1988, when they achieved promotion to Tercera División. After three seasons, they achieved a first-ever promotion to Segunda División B, but suffered an immediate relegation shortly after.

After four consecutive seasons in the fourth division, the club folded in 1996, after suffering another relegation. In 2017, after 21 years without a club in the city, Roldán CD was created.

Season to season

1 season in Segunda División B
7 seasons in Tercera División

References

External links
Fútbol Regional team profile 

Defunct football clubs in the Region of Murcia
Association football clubs established in 1969
Association football clubs disestablished in 1996
1969 establishments in Spain
1996 disestablishments in Spain